The 2014–15 Kazakhstan Basketball Championship was the 23rd season of the Kazakhstan Basketball Championship, the highest professional basketball league in Kazakhstan. Its official designation in full was: XXIIth basketball Championship of the Republic of Kazakhstan for men's teams (National league).

The regular season ran from 8 October 2014 to 27 March 2015, May 9, 2004, 4 teams played 18 games each, with 6 confrontations between every side.

The playoffs ran from 29 March 2015 to 10 April 2015, BC Astana won their fourth consecutive title by beating Almatynski Legion in the final.

Teams

Season narrative
BC Astana finished in first place after the regular season, earning the top seed for the playoffs.

All four teams advanced to the playoffs, they were joined by the two best teams of the second division Higher league, namely Kazygurt Shymkent and Barsy Atyrau.
The latter two teams played a best-of-three series against Almatynski Legion and Caspiy Aktau, the two lowest ranked National league team sides, who both won their respective series to advance to the final four.

The Final four, with all match-ups decided in a single game, saw Almatynski Legion and Caspiy Aktau play against the top two sides of the regular season, BC Astana and PBC Kapchagay, with Almatynski Legion and BC Astana proceeding to the final, the defeated sides playing for third place.
The final saw BC Astana crush Almatynski Legion 82-56 on 10 April 2015 to claim the championship for the fourth time in a row.

Regular season

Play-offs

Semifinals

BC Astana vs. Caspiy Aktau

Almatynski Legion vs. PBC Kapchagay

Third place game

Caspiy Aktau vs. PBC Kapchagay

Final

BC Astana vs. Almatynski Legion

All-Kazakhstan Basketball Championship team
The league selected their choice of the best players at each position for the season.
Best point guard:  Jerry Johnson (Astana)
Best shooting guard:  Kris Richard (Aktau)
Best small forward:  Yuriy Kozhanov (Almaty)
Best power forward:  Dmitri Gavrilov (Kapchagay)
Best center:  Rašid Mahalbašić (Astana)

Notes

References

External links
National Basketball Federation Kazakhstan season profile Retrieved 22 June 2015
FIBA game center season recap Retrieved 22 June 2015
Asia-Basket season recap Retrieved 22 June 2015

2014 in basketball
2015 in basketball
Kazakhstan Basketball Championship